Celebrity 100 was an annual list compiled and published by Forbes magazine since 1999, preceding by the Forbes Top 40 entertainers list. Until 2014, the rankings were made based on a complex combination of factors, including earnings, social media following, magazine covers and a range of qualitative metrics, with the aim of "measuring power". Since 2015, Forbes has solely factored pretax earnings (from June of the previous year through June of the publishing year), before deducting fees for managers, lawyers and agents.

Celebrity 100 lists

Below is the top 10 for each year since the list's inception.

1990s

2000s

2010s

2020s

References

External links
 of The Celebrity 100 (latest)

Annual magazine issues
Lists of celebrities
Forbes lists